Gulf Film is a film distributor which was established in 1989. It is focused on film distribution for major studios from around the world as well as independent English and Arabic films catering to audiences across the Middle East. Gulf Film is the distribution rights owner of more than 150 titles – that's almost half of the films distributed in the region. Gulf Film is by far the largest film distributor in the Middle East.

Gulf Film took a step forward in the year 2000 and expanded its portfolio by creating Grand Cinemas. Later on, in 2014 the chain of cinema was rebranded and re-inaugurated to become Novo Cinemas. Currently Novo Cinemas is the largest chain of theatres in the Middle East.

In January Gulf Films released Fox's Taken 3, which pulled in $10.3 million — the region's ninth largest box office intake ever – after star Liam Neeson attended the Middle East's first Hollywood-style fan premiere in Dubai.

Gulf Film is headquartered in Dubai, United Arab Emirates.

History 
The Grand Cinemas brand name was launched in Dubai, United Arab Emirates, in 2000. It was relaunched on May 6, 2014, as Novo Cinemas.

In July 2005, Grand Cinemas launched the first IMAX in the Middle East at Ibn Battuta Mall Megaplex in Dubai.

Services 
 THE LINK
 PRODDIGI
 AGENCIES

Films distributed in the Middle East 
 SPECTRE
 The Last King
 99 Homes
 The Prophet
 Taken 3

See also 
 The Movie Masters Cinema Group, Grand Cinemas is also a cinema chain, operating under parent company Movie Masters, in Western Australia. Movie Masters also operates Ace Cinemas.

References 

 http://gulfnews.com/business/sectors/media/for-novo-it-is-going-to-be-more-than-just-cinema-1.1335511
 http://www.tradearabia.com/news/MEDIA_287534.html

External links 
 Novo cinemas
 Gulf Film

1980s establishments in the United Arab Emirates
Film production companies of the United Arab Emirates
Mass media companies of the United Arab Emirates
Cinema chains in the United Arab Emirates
Companies based in Dubai